Muhammad Zubir bin Mohd Azmi (born 14 November 1991) is a Malaysian football player who plays for Malaysia Premier League club Kelantan as a left-back.

Club career

Pahang
In January 2017, Zubir signed a contract with Malaysia Super League side Pahang from Terengganu for an undisclosed fee.

International career
Zubir made his international debut for the Malaysia national team, as a substitute, in a friendly match with Australia on 7 October 2011. Malaysia lost this match heavily 5–0. 

In 2012, Zubir was called up for national team for AFF Suzuki Cup 2012 and Malaysia only get to semi final lost 3–1 to Thailand on aggregate. In 2014, Zubir get another call up by Malaysian coach Dollah Salleh for 2014 AFF Suzuki Cup. Malaysia through to the final but lost 4–3 to Thailand on the aggregate. Only two Terengganu player at the Malaysian AFF Cup 2014 squad, Zubir and Abdul Manaf Mamat.

Career statistics

Club

International

Honours
 Southeast Asian Games: 2011
 AFF Suzuki Cup runner-up: 2014

References

Living people
1991 births
People from Terengganu
Malaysian footballers
Malaysia international footballers
Terengganu FC players
Kelantan F.C. players
Malaysian people of Malay descent
Malaysia Super League players
Association football fullbacks
Footballers at the 2014 Asian Games
Southeast Asian Games gold medalists for Malaysia
Southeast Asian Games medalists in football
Competitors at the 2011 Southeast Asian Games
Asian Games competitors for Malaysia